is a railway station on the Himi Line in the city of Himi in Toyama Prefecture, Japan, operated by West Japan Railway Company (JR West).

Lines

Station layout
Shimao Station consists of a single ground-level side platform, serving a single bi-directional track. The station is unattended.

Adjacent stations

History
Shimao Station was opened on April 5, 1912. With the privatization of the JNR on April 1, 1987, the station came under the control of the West Japan Railway Company. A new station building was completed in February 2009.

Passenger statistics
In fiscal 2015, the station was used by an average of 197 passengers daily (boarding passengers only).

Surrounding area
National Route 415
Shimao Post Office
Shimao Swimming Beach

See also
 List of railway stations in Japan

References

External links

  

Railway stations in Toyama Prefecture
Stations of West Japan Railway Company
Railway stations in Japan opened in 1912
Himi Line
Himi, Toyama